Martian gullies are small, incised networks of narrow channels and their associated downslope sediment deposits, found on the planet of Mars. They are named for their resemblance to terrestrial gullies. First discovered on images from Mars Global Surveyor, they occur on steep slopes, especially on the walls of craters. Usually, each gully has a dendritic alcove at its head, a fan-shaped apron at its base, and a single thread of incised channel linking the two, giving the whole gully an hourglass shape. They are estimated to be relatively young because they have few, if any craters. A subclass of gullies is also found cut into the faces of sand dunes, that are themselves considered to be quite young. Linear dune gullies are now considered recurrent seasonal features.

Most gullies occur 30 degrees poleward in each hemisphere, with greater numbers in the southern hemisphere. Some studies have found that gullies occur on slopes that face all directions; others have found that the greater number of gullies are found on poleward facing slopes, especially from 30° to 44° S. Although thousands have been found, they appear to be restricted to only certain areas of the planet. In the northern hemisphere, they have been found in Arcadia Planitia, Tempe Terra, Acidalia Planitia, and Utopia Planitia. In the south, high concentrations are found on the northern edge of Argyre basin, in northern Noachis Terra, and along the walls of the Hellas outflow channels.  A recent study examined 54,040 CTX images that covered 85% of the Martian surface found 4861 separate gullied landforms (e.g., individual craters, mounds, valleys, etc.), which totaled tens of thousands of individual gullies.  It is estimated that CTX can resolve 95% of gullies.

This article gives a history of the discovery and research on gullies.  As research progresses, the cause of Martian gullies has shifted from recent liquid water to pieces of dry ice moving down steep slopes, but research continues. On the basis of their form, aspects, positions, and location amongst and apparent interaction with features thought to be rich in water ice, many researchers think that the processes carving the gullies involve liquid water.  When the volumes of the aprons are compared to the rest of the gully, it appears that there is much less volume in the apron; hence, much of the material may have contained water and ice that disappeared.  However, this remains a topic of active research. Because the gullies are so young, this would suggest that liquid water has been present on Mars in its very recent geological past, with consequences for the potential habitability of the modern surface.
On July 10, 2014, NASA reported that gullies on the surface of Mars were mostly formed by the seasonal freezing of carbon dioxide (CO2), and not by that of liquid water as considered earlier.

Formation

After being discovered, many hypotheses were put forward to explain the gullies. However, as in the usual progression of science, some ideas came to be more plausible than others when more observations were made, when other instruments were used, and when statistical analysis was employed. Even though some gullies resembled debris flows on Earth, it was found that many gullies were on slopes that were not steep enough for typical debris flows. Calculations showed that the pressure and temperatures were not right for liquid carbon dioxide. Moreover, the winding shape of the gullies suggested that the flows were slower than what would be produced in debris flows or eruptions of liquid carbon dioxide. Liquid carbon dioxide would explode out of the ground in the thin Martian atmosphere. Because the liquid carbon dioxide would throw material over 100 meters, the channels should be discontinuous, but they are not. Eventually, most hypotheses were narrowed to involve liquid water coming from an aquifer, from melting at the base of old glaciers (or snowpacks), or from the melting of ice in the ground when the climate was warmer.

Close-up images with HiRISE showed details that support the idea that a fluid was involved.  Images show that channels were formed a number of times.  Smaller channels were found in larger valleys, suggesting that after a valley formed another formed at a later time.  Many cases showed channels took different paths at different times.  Streamlined forms like teadrop-shaped islands were common in some channels.  The following group of pictures of gullies illustrate some of the shapes that lead researchers to think that water was involved in creating at least some of the gullies.

However, more studies open up other possibilities; a study released in October 2010, proposes that some gullies, the ones on sand dunes, may be produced by a buildup of solid carbon dioxide during cold winter months.

On July 10, 2014, NASA reported that gullies on the surface of Mars were mostly formed by the seasonal freezing of carbon dioxide (CO2 ice or 'dry ice'), and not by that of liquid water as thought earlier.

The exact cause/causes of these gullies is still under debate.  A study supported formation by the melting of ground ice or snowpack as the chief cause.  Over 54,000 CTX images were examined which covered about 85% of the surface of the planet.

Aquifers

Most of the gully alcove heads occur at the same level, just as one would expect if water came out of an aquifer. Various measurements and calculations show that liquid water could exist in aquifers at the usual depths where gullies begin. One variation of this model is that rising hot magma could have melted ice in the ground and caused water to flow in aquifers. Aquifers are layers that allow water to flow. They may consist of porous sandstone. The aquifer layer would be perched on top of another layer that prevents water from going down (in geological terms it would be called impermeable). Because water in an aquifer is prevented from going down, the only direction the trapped water can flow is horizontally. Eventually, water could flow out onto the surface when the aquifer reaches a break—like a crater wall. The resulting flow of water could erode the wall to create gullies. Aquifers are quite common on Earth. A good example is "Weeping Rock" in Zion National Park Utah. However, the idea that aquifers formed the gullies does not explain the ones found on isolated peaks, like knobs and the central peaks of craters. Also, a type of gully seems to be present on sand dunes. Aquifers need a wide collecting area which is not present on sand dunes or on isolated slopes. Even though most of the original gullies that were seen seemed to come from the same layer in the slope, some exceptions to this pattern have been found. Examples of gullies coming from different levels is shown below in the image of Lohse Crater and the image of gullies in Ross Crater.

Snowpacks

Much of the surface of Mars is covered by a thick smooth mantle that is thought to be a mixture of ice and dust. This ice-rich mantle, a few yards thick, smooths the land, but in places it has a bumpy texture, resembling the surface of a basketball. The mantle may be like a glacier and under certain conditions the ice that is mixed in the mantle could melt and flow down the slopes and make gullies. Calculations show that a third of a mm of runoff can be produced each day for 50 days of each Martian year even under current conditions. Because there are few craters on this mantle, the mantle is thought to be relatively young. An excellent view of this mantle is shown below in the picture of the Ptolemaeus Crater Rim, as seen by HiRISE.

The ice-rich mantle may be the result of climate changes. Changes in Mars's orbit and tilt cause significant changes in the distribution of water ice from polar regions down to latitudes equivalent to Texas. During certain climate periods water vapor leaves polar ice and enters the atmosphere. The water comes back to ground at lower latitudes as deposits of frost or snow mixed generously with dust. The atmosphere of Mars contains a great deal of fine dust particles. Water vapor will condense on the particles, then fall down to the ground due to the additional weight of the water coating. When Mars is at its greatest tilt or obliquity, up to 2 cm of ice could be removed from the summer ice cap and be deposited at midlatitudes. This movement of water could last for several thousand years and create a snow layer of up to around 10 meters thick. When ice at the top of the mantling layer goes back into the atmosphere, it leaves behind dust, which insulates the remaining ice.

When the slopes, orientations, and elevations of thousands of gullies were compared, clear patterns emerged from the data. Measurements of altitudes and slopes of gullies support the idea that snowpacks or glaciers are associated with gullies. Steeper slopes have more shade which would preserve snow.
Higher elevations have far fewer gullies because ice would tend to sublimate more in the thin air of the higher altitude. For example, Thaumasia quadrangle is heavily cratered with many steep slopes. It is in the right latitude range, but its altitude is so high that there is not enough pressure to keep ice from sublimating (going directly from a solid to a gas); hence it does not have gullies. A large study done with several years worth of data from Mars Global Surveyor showed that there is a tendency for gullies to be on poleward facing slopes; these slopes have more shade that would keep snow from melting and allow large snowpacks to accumulate.

In general, it is now estimated that during periods of high obliquity, the ice caps will melt causing higher temperature, pressure, and moisture. The moisture will then accumulate as snow in midlatitudes, especially in the more shaded areas—pole facing, steep slopes. At a certain time of the year, sunlight will melt snow with the resulting water producing gullies.

Direct evidence for these snowpacks was recently discovered for the first time, showing that this mantle is indeed composed of <~1% dust and ice  Changes observed within gullies over multiple Mars Years shows that dusty ice being exposed today is disappearing, and potentially melting to form channels within the mantle, and the rock underneath.

Melting of ground (pore) ice

The third theory is that climate changes may be enough to allow ice deposited from atmospheric vapor into the ground to melt and thus form the gullies. During a warmer climate, the first few meters of ground could thaw and produce a "debris flow" similar to those on the dry and cold Greenland east coast. Since the gullies occur on steep slopes only a small decrease of the shear strength of the soil particles is needed to begin the flow. Small amounts of liquid water from melted ground ice could be enough to lead to erosion. However, it is likely that ice deposited in the pores of soil in the ground will diffuse back into the atmosphere rather than melt. Similar pore ice diffusion was also observed in-situ at the Phoenix landing site

Recent changes in gullies

As soon as gullies were discovered, researchers began to image many gullies over and over, looking for possible changes.  By 2006, some changes were found.  Later, with further analysis it was determined that the changes could have occurred by dry granular flows rather than being driven by flowing water. With continued observations many more changes were found in Gasa Crater and others. Channels widened by 0.5 to 1 m; meter sized boulders moved; and hundreds of cubic meters of material moved.  It was calculated that gullies could be formed under present conditions with as little as 1 event in 50–500 years.  So, although today there is little liquid water, present geological/climatic processes could still form gullies.  Large amounts of water or great changes in climate are not needed.  However, some gullies in the past may have been aided by weather changes that involved larger amounts of water, perhaps from melted snow.  With more repeated observations, more and more changes have been found; since the changes occur in the winter and spring, experts are tending to suspect that gullies were formed from carbon dioxide ice (dry ice). Recent studies describe using the High Resolution Imaging Science Experiment (HiRISE) camera on MRO to examine gullies at 356 sites, starting in 2006. Thirty-eight of the sites showed active gully formation.  Before-and-after images demonstrated the timing of this activity coincided with seasonal carbon dioxide frost and temperatures that would not have allowed for liquid water.  When dry ice frost changes to a gas, it may lubricate dry material to flow especially on steep slopes. In some years frost, perhaps as thick as 1 meter, triggers avalanches. This frost contains mostly dry ice, but also has tiny amounts of water ice.

Observations with HiRISE show widespread activity in southern hemisphere gullies, especially in those that appear fresh. Significant channel incision and large-scale mass movements have been seen.  Sinuous channels which were thought to need liquid water for their formation have even been seen to form over just a few years when liquid water cannot exist.  The timing of gully activity is seasonal and happens during the period when seasonal frost is present and defrosting.

These observations support a model in which currently active gully formation is driven mainly by seasonal CO2 frost. Simulations described in a 2015 conference, show that high pressure CO2 gas trapping in the subsurface can cause debris flows.  The conditions that can lead to this are found in latitudes where gullies occur.  This research was described in a later article entitled, "Formation of gullies on Mars by debris flows triggered by CO2 sublimation."  In the model, CO2 ice accumulates in the cold winter.  It piles up on a frozen permafrost layer that consists of ice-cemented dirt.  When the higher intensity sunlight of spring begins, light penetrates the translucent dry ice layer, consequently warming the ground.  The CO2 ice absorbs heat and sublimates—that is changes directly from a solid to a gas.  This gas builds up pressure because it is trapped between the ice and the frozen ground.  Eventually, pressure builds up enough to explode through the ice taking with it soil particles.  The dirt particles mix with the pressurized gas and act as a fluid that can flow down the slope and carve gullies. 

The major issue with the CO2 frost model is trying to explain the erosion of rocks. Although there is considerable evidence for CO2 frost transporting loose materials, it seems unlikely that sublimating CO2 gas can erode and weather rocks to form gullies. Instead, CO2 frost might only be able to modify pre-existing gullies.

Using data from the Compact Reconnaissance Imaging Spectrometer for Mars (CRISM) and High Resolution Imaging Science Experiment (HiRISE) on the Mars Reconnaissance Orbiter researchers studied over 100 Martian gully sites and found no evidence for specific minerals being more likely to be associated with gullies, or with the formation of hydrated minerals that would have been made by recent liquid water.  This research adds evidence that liquid water was not involved with gully formation. However, as described above, the amounts of liquid water thought to be generated in near-freezing conditions from melting snowpacks are unlikely to cause chemical weathering in the first place.

Some researchers believe that gully formation may involve both dry ice and liquid water.

How changing tilt affects the climate
It is estimated that a few million years ago, the tilt of the axis of Mars was 45 degrees instead of its present 25 degrees. Its tilt, also called obliquity, varies greatly because its two tiny moons cannot stabilize it, like our relatively large moon does to the Earth. During such periods of high tilt, the summer rays of the sun strike the mid-latitude crater surfaces straight on, thus the surface remains dry.

Note that at high tilt, the ice caps at the poles disappear, the atmosphere thickness, and the moisture in the atmosphere goes up. These conditions cause snow and frost to appear on the surface. However, any snow that falls at night and during the cooler parts of the day disappears when the day warms.

Things are quite different as fall approaches, for the pole-facing slopes remain in the shade all day. Shade causes snow to accumulate through the fall and winter seasons.

In the spring at certain point, the ground will be warm enough and the air pressure high enough for liquid water to form at certain times of the day.
There may be sufficient water to produce gullies by erosion. Or, the water may soak into the ground, and later move down as a debris flow. Gullies on Earth formed by this process resemble Martian gullies.
The great changes in the tilt of Mars explain both the strong relationship of gullies to certain latitude bands and the fact that the vast majority of gullies exist on shady, pole-facing slopes. Models support the idea that pressure/temperature changes during high obliquity times are enough to allow liquid water to be stable in places where gullies are common.

Research published in January 2015 suggests that these seasonal changes could have happened within the last two million years (between 400,000 and two million years ago) creating conditions suitable for formation of the gullies through ice melt.

Associated features of gullies

Some steep slopes show other features in addition to gullies.  At the base of some gullies there may be curved ridges or depressions.  These have been named "spatulate depressions."  Along walls, like crater walls, ice often accumulates during certain phases of the Martian climate cycle.  When the climate changes, this ice can sublimate into the thin Martian atmosphere.  Sublimation is when a substance goes directly from a solid state to a gas state.  Dry ice on Earth does this.  So when the ice at the base of a steep wall sublimates, a spatulate depression results.  Also, more ice from higher up the wall will tend to flow downward.  This flow will stretch the surface rocky debris thereby forming transverse crevasses.  Such formations have been termed "washboard terrain" because they resemble the old fashioned washboards.  The parts of gullies and some associated features of gullies are shown below in a HiRISE images.

Images from around Mars

Phaethontis quadrangle gullies
The Phaethontis quadrangle is the location of many gullies that may be due to recent flowing water. Some are found in the Gorgonum Chaos and in many craters near the large craters Copernicus and Newton (Martian crater).

Eridania quadrangle gullies

Argyre quadrangle gullies

Thaumasia quadrangle gullies

Mare Acidalium quadrangle gullies

Arcadia quadrangle gullies

Diacria quadrangle gullies

Noachis quadrangle gullies

Casius quadrangle gullies

Ismenius Lacus quadrangle gullies

Iapygia quadrangle gullies

Hellas quadrangle gullies

Gullies on dunes

Gullies are found on some dunes.  These are somewhat different than gullies in other places, like the walls of craters.  Gullies on dunes seem to keep the same width for a long distance and often just end with a pit, instead of an apron.  They are often just a few meters across with raised banks along the sides.   Many of these gullies are found on dunes in Russell (Martian crater).  In the winter dry ice accumulates on the dunes and then in the spring dark spots appear and dark-toned streaks grow downhill.  After the dry ice is gone, new channels are visible.  These gullies may be caused by blocks of dry ice moving down the steep slope or perhaps from dry ice starts the sand moving.  In the thin atmosphere of mars, dry ice will expel carbon dioxide with vigor.

See also

References

External links

  Video demonstrates how dry ice can form gullies on dunes

  Gives a general review of many of the theories involving the origin of gullies.
  Gives a good review of the history of the discovery of gullies.

Geology of Mars